Clerodendrum palmatolobatum is an Asian species of flowering plant in the family Lamiaceae.  C. palmatolobatum is found in Cambodia and Vietnam, where it may be called ngọc nữ lá chân vịt: meaning [ngọc nữ = Clerodendrum] with leaves like duck's feet.

Description 

C.  palmatolobatum is a shrub, growing up to 3 m tall, with bright red flowers.  The overall appearance is similar to other "pagoda flowers" such as C. paniculatum, only with distinctive lobed, variable leaves that are approximately 130 x 100 mm with 5-7 lobes.

References

External links

palmatolobatum
Flora of Indo-China
Plants described in 1935